Drucina is a Neotropical butterfly genus in the family Nymphalidae.

Species
Drucina championi Godman & Salvin, [1881]
Drucina leonata Butler, 1872

References

Satyrinae
Nymphalidae of South America
Nymphalidae genera
Taxa named by Arthur Gardiner Butler